Alexei I. Miller is the Russian professor of history at Central European University and formerly research fellow at the Russian Academy of Sciences, senior fellow at the Institut für die Wissenschaften vom Menschen.

Selected books and publications
 (2003) The Ukrainian Question: The Russian Empire and Nationalism in the Nineteenth Century (Central European University Press)
 (2008) The Romanov Empire and Nationalism: Essays in the Methodology of Historical Research (Central European University Press)

References

Living people
Historians of Ukraine
Historians of Russia
21st-century Russian historians
Year of birth missing (living people)
Place of birth missing (living people)
Academic staff of Central European University